George Smyth may refer to:

George W. Smyth (1803–1866), Texas politician
George Smyth (lawyer) (1705–1772), Irish lawyer and politician
George Smyth (Canadian politician) (1864–1938), Ontario farmer and political figure
George Stracey Smyth (1767–1823), Canadian politician
Sir George Smyth, 6th Baronet (1784–1852), British Member of Parliament for Colchester
George Smyth (physician) (c. 1629–1702), Original Fellow of the Royal Society, on List of Fellows of the Royal Society elected in 1663
George W. Smyth (Mississippi judge) (died 1832), a justice of the Supreme Court of Mississippi

See also
George Smith (disambiguation)
George Smythe (disambiguation)